Donald Harrington was an American ambassador to Costa Rica in 1993.

References

Living people
Ambassadors of the United States to Costa Rica
Year of birth missing (living people)